Alexander David Frederick Lloyd, 2nd Baron Lloyd (30 September 1912 – 5 November 1985), was a British Conservative politician.

Lloyd was the only son of George Lloyd, 1st Baron Lloyd, and his wife, Blanche Isabella (née Lascelles). He succeeded his father in the barony in 1941 and took his seat on the Conservative benches in the House of Lords. He served under Winston Churchill (a close political associate of his father) as a Lord-in-waiting (government whip in the House of Lords) from 1951 to 1952 and as Under-Secretary of State for the Home Department from 1952 to 1954, and under Churchill and later Sir Anthony Eden as Under-Secretary of State for the Colonies from 1954 to 1957.

Lord Lloyd married Lady Victoria Jean Marjorie Mabell Ogilvy, daughter of David Ogilvy, 12th Earl of Airlie, in 1942. They had one son and two daughters:
 The Hon. Davinia Margaret Lloyd (b. 13 March 1943)
 The Hon. Charles George David Lloyd (4 April 1949 – 1974)
 The Hon. Laura Blanche Bridget Lloyd (b. 7 March 1960)

Lord Lloyd died in November 1985, aged 73. As his only son had predeceased him, the barony became extinct upon his death.

Notes

References

1912 births
1985 deaths
Barons Lloyd
Members of London County Council
Ministers in the third Churchill government, 1951–1955
Ministers in the Eden government, 1955–1957
Lloyd family of Birmingham